Kiwyu (Jaqaru for a kind of partridges, hispanicized spelling Quiuyo) is a mountain in the Andes of Peru which reaches an altitude of approximately . It is located in the Lima Region, Huarochirí Province, Huanza District. Kiwyu lies northwest of a lake named Saqsaqucha (Quechua for "multi-colored lake").

References

Mountains of Peru
Mountains of Lima Region